Elachista alampeta is a moth of the family Elachistidae. It is found in Western Australia.

The forewings are bluish white. The hindwings are brownish grey.

References

Moths described in 2011
alampeta
Moths of Australia
Taxa named by Lauri Kaila